Bhogapuram International Airport is a proposed greenfield international airport project to be built near Bhogapuram in Vizianagaram district, about  north-east of Visakhapatnam.

History

Planning 
There was a proposal for setting up a greenfield airport under the erstwhile Andhra Pradesh state at Visakhapatnam. Alternate sites like Bheemunipatnam, Sabbavaram, Atchutapuram, and Koruprolu were also considered. The Airports Authority of India (AAI) gave its technical approval of the project site in June 2015. The request for proposals (RFP) for the project was issued in July 2016, and AAI and the GMR Group submitted their technical and financial bids in August 2017.

The current Visakhapatnam Airport is a civil enclave on a naval airfield which operates only one international flight due to its status as a "restricted international airport", while the Navy proposed the flying slots for civilians in the existing airport and hence suffers from constraints.

Construction 
The airport's foundation stone was laid by the government of Andhra Pradesh on 14 February 2019, with initial plans to develop the mega aerotropolis on an estimated 5,311 acres of land, consisting of Bhogapuram Airport, cargo facilities, an MRO (maintenance, repair and overhaul) facility and an aviation academy. The government has acquired 2,703 acres of land because of land agitation from locals, including 1,673 acres of government land allotted for the project.

An in-principle approval has been granted for the project, that would be developed by the government of Andhra Pradesh under a PPP basis. A pre-bid meeting was held in August 2018, for which 13 developers showed interest in developing this airport. The government finally approved the GMR Group, who also operates the international airports of Indira Gandhi International Airport at New Delhi and Rajiv Gandhi International Airport at Hyderabad.

However, the successive YSRCP government fixed 2,200 acres to GMR Group and reduced the land for the purpose while keeping aside 500 acres of land under the control of state government with no official reasons mentioned. The airport would be constructed on a final 2,200-acre site in and around Bhogapuram that serves the city of Visakhapatnam. It would be built by GMR Visakhapatnam International Airport Limited (GVIAL), a Special Purpose Vehicle (SPV) owned by the GMR Group that was set up in June 2020. The project would be taken up in the public–private partnership (PPP) mode with the state holding a stake in the form of land holdings.

The proposed airport is 45 km away from Visakhapatnam, 25 km away from Vizianagaram and 63 km away from Srikakulam cities. The airport majorly serves the North Coastal Andhra region and is expected as a major source of employment in the region. The region is connected to the proposed airport by National Highway 16, National Highway 26 currently and also through Vizag beach corridor and Vizag metro in the future. While APSRTC plans to run connecting buses to nearby cities, Vizianagaram junction is the nearest railway station at a distance of 26 km.

Currently, one 3800m long runway of 12L / 30R orientation is being planned along with MRO facilities.

In September 2022, Indian Navy officials have agreed to move the Visakhapatnam Airport to Bhogapuram. Regarding this, Indian Navy and Andhra Pradesh Airports Development Corporation Limited (APADCL) officials has signed a MOU in New Delhi. On the other hand, only 28 more acres have to be collected for construction in Bhogapuram. The trial in the court cases on this issue has been completed and the verdict is in reserve. The airport's construction is expected to start by the end of 2022, and is expected to be completed by December 2024. Upon completion of Phase 1, the terminal handling capacity is expected to be 6.3 million passengers per year, and will rise to 18 million passengers per year upon completion of Phase 2.

See also
 Vijayawada Airport
 Visakhapatnam Airport

References 

Airports in Andhra Pradesh
Proposed airports in Andhra Pradesh
Buildings and structures in Vizianagaram district
Transport in Vizianagaram district